Leonardo Bellandi (born 12 January 2000) is an Italian footballer who plays as a midfielder for Serie B side Livorno.

Club statistics

Club

Notes

References

2000 births
Living people
Italian footballers
Association football midfielders
Serie B players
U.S. Livorno 1915 players
Sportspeople from Livorno
Footballers from Tuscany